Basant Kumar Biswal (August 23, 1936 – September 7, 2003) was a politician belonging to the Indian National Congress party from Odisha. He was Deputy Chief Minister of Odisha. He was member of the legislative assembly from Tirtol assembly constituency and was Vice-President of the Odisha Pradesh Congress Committee.

He had two sons, Ranjib Biswal a former cricketer, manager of the Indian Cricket Team and Chairman of Indian Premier League, as well as a Rajya Sabha Member of parliament for Odisha, as part of the Indian National Congress party. His second son Chiranjib Biswal is a Congress MLA from Jagatsinghpur assembly constituency and deputy opposition leader of the Odisha assembly.

References

External links
 Basant Kumar Biswal MLA Profile

1936 births
2003 deaths
Members of the Odisha Legislative Assembly
Place of birth missing
Deputy chief ministers of Odisha
Indian National Congress politicians
People from Jagatsinghpur district
Indian National Congress politicians from Odisha